General Manoj Pande,  (born 6 May 1962) is an Indian Army General serving as the 29th and the current Chief of the Army Staff. He previously served as the Vice Chief of the Army Staff, General Officer-Commanding-in-Chief of Eastern Command and also as the Commander-in-Chief (CINCAN) of Andman and Nicobar Command. He is the first officer from the Corps of Engineers to become the Army Chief.

As the COAS, he took over as the Honorary Colonel of the Sikh Light Infantry Regiment on 11 May 2022 and as the Colonel of the Regiment of the 61st Cavalry on 17 May 2022. He became the 23rd COAS to take over Colonelcy of the mounted Cavalry Regiment.

Early life and education 
Pande was born to Dr. C. G. Pande, a consulting Psychotherapist who retired as the Head of the Department of Psychology of Nagpur University, and Prema, an announcer and host with the All India Radio. The family hails from Nagpur. After his schooling from Kendriya Vidyalaya, he joined the 61st-course of the National Defence Academy (NDA) in January 1979 and was assigned to the Lima squadron, where he graduated with the degree of Bachelor of Science. After graduating from the NDA, he joined the Indian Military Academy and was commissioned as an officer. He subsequently attended the College of Military Engineering, Pune and earned a Bachelor of Technology degree in Civil Engineering.

Career 
Pande was commissioned into the Bombay Sappers, one of the regiments in the Corps of Engineers, in December 1982. He attended the Staff College, Camberley in the United Kingdom. After completing the course, he returned to India and was appointed brigade major of a mountain brigade in Northeast India.  After promotion to the rank of lieutenant colonel, he served as the Chief Engineer at the United Nations Mission in Ethiopia and Eritrea.

Pande has commanded the 117 Engineer Regiment along the Line of Control (LOC) in Jammu and Kashmir. He was in command of the regiment during Operation Parakram. He then attended the Army War College, Mhow and completed the Higher Command Course. After the course, he was appointed Colonel Q at HQ 8 Mountain Division. The division was then commanded by the Major General Dalbir Singh Suhag. He was then promoted to the rank of brigadier and given command of an Engineer brigade as part of a Strike Corps in the western theatre. He also commanded the 52 Infantry Brigade, positioned along the LOC. Pande was selected to attend the prestigious National Defence College. After completing the course, he was appointed Brigadier General Staff Operations (BGS-Ops) at HQ Eastern Command.

General officer
After promotion to the rank of major general, Pande took command of 8 Mountain Division which was involved in high-altitude operations in western Ladakh. He then served a tenure in the Military Operations directorate at Army Headquarters as the Additional Director General (ADG). Promoted to the rank of Lieutenant General, he served as the Chief of Staff of the Southern Command. On 30 December 2018, Pande took command of the IV Corps at Tezpur from Lieutenant General Gurpal Singh Sangha. The corps is deployed along the Line of Actual Control (LAC) as well as in Counter-insurgency operations in the North-East. After about a year-and-a half at the helm of IV Corps, he moved to Army HQ and was appointed Director General dealing with subjects of Discipline, Ceremonial and Welfare.

On 30 April 2020, Pande was appointed the next Commander-in-Chief, Andaman and Nicobar Command (CINCAN). He assumed command on 1 June 2020 after the incumbent Lt Gen P S Rajeshwar superannuated on 31 May 2020. A year later, he was appointed General Officer Commanding-in-Chief Eastern Command. He handed over charge of CINCAN to Lieutenant General Ajai Singh on 31 May and took command of the Eastern Command on 1 June. He was appointed as the next Vice Chief of the Army Staff succeeding Lieutenant General Chandi Prasad Mohanty on his superannuation on 31 January 2022.

On 18 April 2022, the Government of India appointed him as the next Chief of the Army Staff, succeeding General Manoj Mukund Naravane.

On 11 May 2022, General Manoj Pande took over as the Honorary Colonel of the Sikh Light Infantry Regiment. He was presented with the Baton & regimental accoutrements by Lt Gen DP Pandey.

Personal life 
Pande married Archana Salpekar, a gold medalist from Government Dental College and Hospital, Nagpur on 3 May 1987. The couple have a son who is an officer in the Indian Air Force.

Honours and decorations 
He is a recipient of the Param Vishisht Seva Medal, Ati Vishisht Seva Medal, and the Vishisht Seva Medal. Apart from these, he has been awarded the Chief of the Army Staff (COAS) Commendation Card and two GOC-in-C commendation cards.

Dates of rank

References 

Indian generals
Living people
Recipients of the Ati Vishisht Seva Medal
Recipients of the Vishisht Seva Medal
Indian Army officers
Chiefs of Army Staff (India)
National Defence Academy (India) alumni
National Defence College, India alumni
Commanders-in-Chief, Andaman and Nicobar Command
People from Nagpur
1962 births
Recipients of the Param Vishisht Seva Medal
Army War College, Mhow alumni